Oxyptilus regulus (the grape boring plume moth) is a moth of the family Pterophoridae. It is found in Australia, but has recently also been recorded from southern India.

Larvae have been recorded feeding on Vitis vinifera. The larvae bore into the ripening berries of the grape bunches and cause substantial injury.

External links
Australian Faunal Directory
Australian Insects
Bionomics of a Grape Boring Plume Moth (Oxyptilus regulus, Meyr.) in South India

Moths of Australia
Oxyptilini
Moths of Asia
Moths described in 1906